Lincolnshire County Cricket Club is one of twenty minor county clubs within the domestic cricket structure of England and Wales. It represents the historic county of Lincolnshire.

The team is currently a member of the Minor Counties Championship Eastern Division and plays in the MCCA Knockout Trophy. Lincolnshire played List A matches occasionally from 1966 until 2004 but is not classified as a List A team per se.

The club is based at Lincoln and plays matches around the county at Lincoln, Bourne, Grantham, London Road, Sleaford and Cleethorpes.

Honours
 Minor Counties Championship (2) – 1966, 2003; shared (1) – 2001
 MCCA Knockout Trophy (0) –

Earliest cricket
Cricket probably reached Lincolnshire in the 18th century. The earliest reference to cricket in the county is dated 1792.

Origin of club
A county organisation was set up in 1853. Grantham's mayor, Arthur Priestley was a prime mover in the development of Lincolnshire cricket, although he played for Nottinghamshire as an amateur. In 1896, he captained an English side in the West Indies. When the Gentlemen of Philadelphia toured England in 1903, they played a Lincolnshire XVI in Grantham with Bart King scoring 176 runs.

The present Lincolnshire CCC was founded on 28 September 1906. It competed in the Minor Counties Championship from 1907 to 1914 and then again from 1924.

Club history
Lincolnshire has won the Minor Counties Championship twice, and also once shared the title. It won the title outright in 1966 and 2003. It shared the accolade in 2001 with Cheshire.

Knockout Trophy
Lincolnshire has never won the MCCA Knockout Trophy since its inception in 1983.

Notable players
The following Lincolnshire cricketers also made an impact on the first-class game:
 Arthur Priestley MP
 Sonny Ramadhin
 Duncan Fearnley
 Somachandra de Silva
 Norman McVicker
 Ian Moore
 Arnold Rylott, known as Bobby.
 Peter D Johnson
 Geoff Cope
 Azeem Rafiq
 Matthew Downman, Notts CCC and England u23

References

Further reading
 Rowland Bowen, Cricket: A History of its Growth and Development, Eyre & Spottiswoode, 1970
 E. W. Swanton (editor), Barclays World of Cricket, Guild, 1986
 Playfair Cricket Annual – various editions
 Wisden Cricketers' Almanack – various editions
 KCS Trushell – Lincolnshire Cricketers
 Tony Webb – Minor Counties Championship (various editions commencing 1895)

External links
 Lincolnshire County Cricket Club website
 Minor Counties Cricket Association Official Site

 
National Counties cricket
History of Lincolnshire
Cricket clubs established in 1906
1906 establishments in England